Tears and Pavan: An Introduction to Strawbs is a compilation album by English band Strawbs.

Track listing

All tracks written by Dave Cousins except where noted.

"New World"
"I Turned My Face into the Wind"
"Oh How She Changed" (Cousins, Tony Hooper)
"Witchwood"
"Where is This Dream of Your Youth"
"Grace Darling"
"Queen of Dreams"
"Tears and Pavan"
"Tears"
"Pavan" (Cousins, Richard Hudson, John Ford)
"Round and Round"
"So Shall Our Love Die"
"Lay Down"
"Down by the Sea"
"Ghosts"
"Sweet Dreams"
"Night Light"
"Guardian Angel"
"Night Light"
"Hero and Heroine"

Personnel

Dave Cousins – vocals, acoustic guitar, electric guitar, dulcimer, piano (all tracks)
Tony Hooper – vocals, acoustic guitar (tracks 1–5,7)
Dave Lambert – vocals, electric guitar (tracks 6,8–14)
Ron Chesterman – double bass (tracks 2,3)
John Ford – bass guitar, acoustic guitar, vocals (tracks 1,4,5,7,8,11,12)
Chas Cronk – bass guitar, vocals (tracks 6,9,10,13,14)
Rick Wakeman – keyboards, clavinet (tracks 4,5)
Blue Weaver – keyboards, accordion (tracks 1,7,8,11,12)
John Hawken – keyboards (tracks 6,9,13,14)
Richard Hudson – drums, vocals (tracks 1,4,5,7,8,11,12)
Rod Coombes – drums, vocals (tracks 6,9,10,13,14)

Release history

References

Tears and Pavan on Strawbsweb

2002 compilation albums
Strawbs compilation albums